Toohey is an electoral district of the Legislative Assembly in the Australian state of Queensland. It was created in the 2017 redistribution. It was named after Toohey Forest Park.

It largely covers the area of the abolished district of Sunnybank. Located in southern Brisbane, Toohey consists of the suburbs of Moorooka, Rocklea, Salisbury, Nathan, Coopers Plains, Robertson, MacGregor, Sunnybank, Runcorn and Eight Mile Plains.

From results of the 2015 election, Toohey was estimated to be a fairly safe seat for the Labor Party with a margin of 8.3%.

Members for Toohey

Election results

See also
 Electoral districts of Queensland
 Members of the Queensland Legislative Assembly by year
 :Category:Members of the Queensland Legislative Assembly by name

References

Electoral districts of Queensland